Oleksii Pashkov (born 6 January 1981) is a Ukrainian track and field athlete who competes in disability athletics in the F36 category. Pashkov represented his country in the discus throw at the 2012 Summer Paralympics in London, where he won the silver medal with a distance of 38.89 metres.

References

1981 births
Living people
Medalists at the 2012 Summer Paralympics
Athletes (track and field) at the 2012 Summer Paralympics
Paralympic silver medalists for Ukraine
Ukrainian male discus throwers
Track and field athletes with disabilities
Sportspeople from Zaporizhzhia
Paralympic medalists in athletics (track and field)
Paralympic athletes of Ukraine